Sparganothoides ocrisana is a species of moth of the family Tortricidae. It is found in Costa Rica, Guatemala and Veracruz in Mexico.

The length of the forewings is 7.8–9.1 mm for males and 8.7–10.4 mm for females. The ground colour of the forewings of the males is brownish yellow, with a scattering of brown to greyish-brown scales and spots. The hindwings are yellowish white at the base and grey at the midwing. Females have brownish-yellow forewings, heavily suffused with greyish brown. The hindwings are grey. Adults have been recorded on wing year round except April and September. There are probably multiple generations per year in Costa Rica and two farther north.

Larvae have been reared on Prunus species.

Etymology
The species name refers to the protuberances of the head and is derived from Greek  (meaning projecting).

References

Moths described in 2009
Sparganothoides